Richard Brady, O.F.M. (died 1607) was an Irish prelate of the Roman Catholic Church who served as Bishop of Ardagh from 1576 to 1580 and then Bishop of Kilmore from 1580 to 1607.

A Franciscan friar, he was appointed the Bishop of Ardagh by Pope Gregory XIII on 23 January 1576. Four years later, Brady was translated to the bishopric of Kilmore on 9 March 1580. He held the honours (temporalities) of the Church of Ireland See of Kilmore until they were deprived by Sir John Perrot, Lord Deputy of Ireland in 1585.

Notes

References

  
 
 
  

Roman Catholic Bishops of Ardagh

Year of birth unknown
1607 deaths
Franciscan bishops
Roman Catholic bishops of Ardagh
Roman Catholic bishops of Kilmore
16th-century Roman Catholic bishops in Ireland
17th-century Roman Catholic bishops in Ireland